Potamophylax juliani is a species of caddisfly in the family Limnephilidae. It was first described in 1999.

References 

Limnephilidae
Insects described in 1999